The Carl Flesch International Violin Competition (also known as the International Competition for Violinists "Carl Flesch" and the City of London International Competition for Violin and Viola (Carl Flesch Medal)) was an international music competition for violinists, and later viola players, held between 1945 and 1992 in London. Founded in honour of the Hungarian violinist Carl Flesch, it was originally organised by the Guildhall School of Music and Drama and after 1968 formed part of the City of London Festival. Particularly in the City of London Festival era, it was regarded as among the "most prestigious" competitions for string players, and "one of the most important testing grounds for aspiring soloists up to the age of 32."

History
The competition was founded in 1945 in honour of the Hungarian violinist Carl Flesch (1873–1944), who was particularly noted as a violin teacher. It was founded in the form of the "Flesch Medal" by Max Rostal and Edric Cundell of the Guildhall School of Music and Drama; Rostal had been a pupil of Flesch. Flesch's son, Carl F. Flesch, was also instrumental in the competition's foundation, and commissioned a commemorative medal portraying his father from Benno Elkan to be presented to the winners. The early competitions were organised by the Guildhall School. Initially they were held annually in October, around the date of Flesch's birthday. From the start they were open to international entrants, with an age cut-off of thirty years. In addition to the medal, the original prize included a concert as a soloist with the London Philharmonic Orchestra. The first competition was won by the British violinist Raymond Cohen; his win was said to have "launched him on to the world stage".

At that date there were relatively few international music competitions; a slightly earlier violin competition is the French Marguerite Long–Jacques Thibaud Competition, which was founded in 1943 but did not attract international competitors until 1946. After the Second World War, the number of competitions increased rapidly. In 1949, the Carl Flesch competition was described by The Musical Times as "the premier international award for violinists under thirty years of age". By 1956, three British orchestras offered solo concerts to the winners: the London Philharmonic, Liverpool Philharmonic and City of Birmingham Orchestra. By the 1960s the final was held at the Wigmore Hall in November.

In 1968, the Carl Flesch competition was one of three international music competitions hosted in England, with a global total of sixteen competitions judging solely instrumentalists. Egon Kraus, in a 1968 review of international music competitions, commented that English violinists had been awarded eight of twelve prizes in the competition in 1956–66, including four overall winners, while considering all competitions Russian violinists performed much better. He noted that a similar skew towards the home nationality was apparent in the results of some other competitions.

In 1968, the competition joined the City of London Festival, an arts festival held in July, and the frequency changed to every two years. By then, the age limit had been raised to thirty-two years. In addition to the Carl Flesch Medal, a first prize of £1000 was offered, with a second prize of £750, third prize of £500 and fourth prize of £250. Yfrah Neaman, a pupil of both Flesch and Rostal, was the director and chair from 1968; he increased the competition's standing by recruiting Yehudi Menuhin and others to serve on the jury. It became a member of the World Federation of International Music Competitions in 1969. In 1970 the remit broadened to include viola players, with the first overall violist winner being Csaba Erdélyi in 1972. The formal title became the City of London International Competition for Violin and Viola (Carl Flesch Medal). According to Groves, it was then "one of the most important testing grounds for aspiring soloists up to the age of 32." The music journalist Norman Lebrecht described it in 2002 as "one of the toughest violin contests".

From the 1970s specially composed test pieces were employed, which derived from a composers' competition organised by the Society for the Promotion of New Music; these include Michael Blake Watkins' The Wings of Night, Edward McGuire's Rant, Helen Roe's Notes towards a Definition and Michael Finnissy's Enek. An audience award began in 1972, and the total prize money increased during the 1970s and 1980s; in 1976, the first prize was worth £1250, with a second prize of £1000, third prize of £750, and three further prizes totalling £800. In 1988 and 1990, the winner received £5000 and the other awards (in 1990) came to £10,000. A gold-mounted bow was also awarded to the winner. In the 1980s and 1990s the finals were held in the Barbican Hall, with six finalists each performing a classical and a romantic or 20th-century concerto over several days in some years.

In 1992, the City of London ceased to fund the competition. Flesch tried unsuccessfully for many years to gather financial support to resurrect it, but the final competition was held that year. The loss of the Carl Flesch competition was described in 2003 by Malcolm Layfield, director of the strings department at the Royal Northern College of Music, as "a gap in the UK's contribution". It is not related to the competition in Hungary first held in 1985 under the title National Carl Flesch Violin Competition, and later as the Carl Flesh International Violin Competition.

Events
A partial list of individual competitions follows. For the winners, see the following section, which lists all the years in which the competition was held.

Winners

A partial list of award winners in the competition; the instrument is violin unless otherwise stated:
1945: Raymond Cohen (UK)
1946: Norbert Brainin (Austria–UK)
1947: Erich Gruenberg (Austria)
1948: Gabriella Lengyel (Hungary) 
1949: John Glickman
1950: Eugene Prokop (Czechoslovakia)
1951: Igor Ozim (Yugoslavia). Runner up: Hugh Bean (UK)
1952: Pierre Jetteur (Belgium). Runner up: Clarence Myerscough (UK)
1953: Betty-Jean Hagen (Canada)
1954: Maria Vischnia (Uruguay). Runners up: Jack Rothstein (Poland–UK), Trevor Williams (UK)
1955: Dénes Kovács (Hungary). Runner up: Agnes Vadas (Hungary)
1956: Ladislav Jasek (Czechoslovakia). Runner up: Steve Staryk (Canada)
1957: Michael Davis
1958: Wilfred Lehmann (Australia)
1959: Ronald Keith Thomas (Australia)
1960: Antoine Goulard (France)
1961: Marie Renaudie
1962: Jean-Jacques Kantorow (France)
1963: Ana Chumachenco (Italy)
1964: Eva Zurbrügg (Switzerland)
1965: Eszter Boda
1966: Andreas Roehn (Germany). Runners up: 2nd: Mariko Takagi (Japan); 3rd: Peter Michalica (Czechoslovakia); 4th: Hervé le Floch (France)
1968: Joshua Epstein (Israel) 
1970: Stoika Milanova (Bulgaria). Runners up: 2nd: Luigi Bianchi (viola; Italy); 3rd: Csaba Erdélyi (viola; Hungary)
1972: Csaba Erdélyi (viola; Hungary), the first violist to win. Runners up: 2nd: Atar Arad (viola; Israel); 3rd: Gonçal Comellas (Spain); 4th: Mincho Minchev; 5th: Michael Bochmann (UK); 6th: Otto Armin (Canada). Audience award: Minchev or Comellas
1974: Mincho Minchev (Bulgaria). Runners up: 2nd: Dong-Suk Kang (Korea); 3rd: Isaac Shuldman (Israel); 4th: Gottfried Schneider (W. Germany); J. S. Bach prize: Elizabeth Wallfisch
1976: Dora Schwarzberg. Runners up: 2nd and Beethoven sonata prize: Andrew Watkinson; 3rd: Magdalena Rezler-Niesiolowska
1978: Eugene Sârbu (Romania). Runner up: 2nd: Takashi Shimizu (Japan)
1980: Barbara Górzyńska
1982: Adelina Oprean. Runners up: 2nd: Krzysztof Smietana; 3rd: Evgenia Popova; 4th: Michelle Makarski (United States); 5th: Kyoko Kimura; 6th: Takumi Kubota.
1984: Masayuki Kino (Japan)
1986: Xue Wei (China) Runner up: 3rd: Mieko Kanno
1988: Sungsic Yang (Korea) Runners up: 2nd: Suzy Wang; 3rd: Vasko Vassilev; Worshipful Company of Musicians Prize: Jean-Marc Phillips. Also a laureate: Vesko Eschkenazy (Bulgaria)
1990: Maxim Vengerov (Russia–Israel)
1992: Benjamin Schmid (Austria)

See also

List of classical music competitions
Henryk Wieniawski Violin Competition
Paganini Competition

References

Sources

Violin competitions
Violas
Music competitions in the United Kingdom
Classical music in London
Music festivals established in 1945
Awards established in 1945